Gordon Roberts may refer to:

 Gordon Roberts (ice hockey) (1891–1966), Canadian ice hockey forward
 Gordon Roberts (footballer) (1925–1991), English footballer
 Gordon Ray Roberts (born 1950), United States Army officer and Medal of Honor recipient
 Gordie Roberts (born 1957), American ice hockey defenseman
 Gordon the Tramp (born 1928), local celebrity in Bournemouth, with worldwide news coverage